Payton is a surname. Notable people with the surname include:

Albert Payton (1898–1967), English cricketer
Andy Payton (born 1967), English former professional footballer
Asie Payton (1937–1997), American blues musician
Barbara Payton (1927–1967), American film actress
Benjamin F. Payton (1932–2016), African-American university president
Bob Payton (1944–1994), American marketing man, restaurateur and hotelier
Boyd E. Payton, (1908–1984), labor organizer born in Bobbin, West Virginia
Bre Payton (1992–2018), American conservative writer
Brian Payton (born 1966), American writer
Bryan Payton (born 1986), professional Canadian football linebacker
Carolyn R. Payton (1925–2001), American psychologist, Director of the United States Peace Corps
Catherine Payton, later known as Catherine Payton Phillips, Quaker minister
Charles Payton (born 1960), American former professional basketball player
Charles Alfred Payton (1843–1926), British adventurer, fisherman, diplomat and writer
Christian Payton (born 1965), American actor and singer
Claude Payton (1882–1955), American actor
Clement W. Payton (1897–1918), English World War I flying ace
David Payton (born 1952), New Zealand diplomat
Denis Payton (1943–2006), English saxophonist
Dermot Payton (born 1945), New Zealand cricketer
Dion Payton (1950–2021), American Chicago blues guitarist and singer
Eddie Payton (born 1951) former American football player
Edward William Payton (1859–1944), photographer and painter in New Zealand
Elfrid Payton (born 1967), Canadian football player
Elfrid Payton, Jr. (born 1994), American basketball player
Estella Payton (1904–1999), American television cook
Gary Payton (born 1968), American basketball player
Gary Payton II (born 1992), American basketball player and son of the above
Gary E. Payton (born 1948), American astronaut
Hannah Payton (born 1994), British professional racing cyclist
Hunter Payton (born 2004), Hispanic American actor
James Payton, American history professor
Jarrett Payton (born 1980), professional American and Canadian football player; son of football player Walter Payton
Jay Payton (born 1972), American former baseball player
Jo Marie Payton (born 1950), American television actress
John Payton (1946–2012), African-American civil rights attorney
John Payton (politician) (born 1967), automobile dealer, Republican member of the Arkansas House of Representatives
Jordan Payton (born 1993), American football player
Khary Payton (born 1972), American actor
Lawrence Payton (1938–1997), American singer, songwriter and record producer
Lucy Payton (1877–1969), American silent film actress
Mark Payton (born 1991), American professional baseball player
Mel Payton (1926–2001), American professional basketball player
Michael Payton (1970–2018), American football quarterback
Muirceartach Ua Peatáin (died 1178), Irish chieftain
Nicholas Payton (born 1973), American jazz trumpeter and keyboard player
Philip Payton (born 1953), British historian
Philip A. Payton, Jr. (1876–1917), African American real estate entrepreneur
Sean Payton (born 1963), head coach of the NFL's Denver Broncos since 2023
Stephen Payton, British Paralympian athlete
Sue C. Payton, American technologist, Assistant Secretary of the Air Force
Tony Payton (born 1981), American politician, member of the Pennsylvania House of Representatives
Walter Payton (1954–1999), American football player
Walter Payton (musician) (1942–2010), American jazz bassist and sousaphonist
Wilfred Payton (1882–1943), English cricketer
Wilfred Payton (priest) (1913–1989), English clergyman and cricketer

See also
Payton (given name)
Peyton (name), given name and surname
Paton (surname)
Paynton
Pyton

English-language surnames